Bishop of Korea may refer to

 Anglican Bishop in Korea, 1889-1965
 Catholic Bishop of Korea, 1831–1911